The 2014 FIM Cross-Country Rallies World Championship season was the 12th season of the FIM Cross-Country Rallies World Championship. The Spanish Marc Coma won his second title, after the last event.

Calendar

The calendar for the 2014 season featured six rallies. Some of the rallies were also part of FIA Cross Country Rally World Cup.

The third event, Rallye des Pharaons after being cancelled in 2013, in 2014 the official teams refused to take part in the race claiming security still remaining after Egyptian Revolution of 2011.

Results

Drivers' Championship

 Points for final position are awarded as in following table

Bonus Points: All riders taking the start of the first stage of the final event, inscribed in the calendar of the FIM Cross Country Rally World Championship, will be awarded 10 points.

127 Drivers have been classified

References

External links
 

FIM Cross-Country Rallies World Championship
Cross–Country Rallies World Championship
2014 in motorcycle sport